The Tha River (Nam Tha) is a river in northwest Laos, and one of the 12 tributaries on the Mekong River. It gave its name to the town of Luang Namtha and the province of the same name. The name Nam Tha (ນໍ້າທາ) means 'Green River', coming from the color of the water in the river.

Rivers of Laos
Tributaries of the Mekong River